The women's 100 metres hurdles event at the 1998 Commonwealth Games was held 20–21 September on National Stadium, Bukit Jalil.

Medalists

Results

Heats
Qualification: First 3 of each heat (Q) and the next 2 fastest qualified for the final.

Wind:Heat 1: +0.6 m/s, Heat 2: +0.3 m/s

Final
Wind: -0.2 m/s

References

100
1998
1998 in women's athletics